Mujib Dam is located in Wadi Mujib, between the cities of Madaba and Kerak, in the Madaba Governorate of Jordan. It is a rolled concrete dam with abutments of clay-core rockfill completed in 2004, after six years of construction. Highway 35, part of the historic King's Highway, crosses the crest. The water it impounds is combined with desalinated water piped from brackish wells along the Dead Sea to the west in a reservoir holding 35 million m (1 billion US gallons) which primarily supplies Amman,  to the north helping to ease a very stressed national water supply.

See also

Al-Wehda Dam
King Talal Dam

References

External links

Dams in Jordan
Madaba Governorate
Dams completed in 2004
2004 establishments in Jordan
Roller-compacted concrete dams
Dead Sea basin